Compton Martin Ochre Mine is a 0.85 hectare geological and biological Site of Special Scientific Interest located on the north side of the Mendip Hills, immediately south west of Compton Martin village, Somerset, notified in 1988.

Geological Interest

It is a Geological Conservation Review site. The site comprises a network of tunnels and surface exposures on the eastern fringe of Compton Wood. The site exposes bedded hematitic iron ore (red ochre) in Triassic Dolomitic Conglomerates which was deposited underwater as a layered mass of iron oxide pellets of various types, probably in an ephemeral lake or pond fed by hot springs when the Mendip area was occupied by a desert environment some 220 million years ago during late Triassic times.

Red ochre is an iron oxide mineral, which was used in paint-making. It is believed that the mine was owned by Mendi Oxide & Ochre Co. Ltd., of Wick.

Biological Interest

The mines are also used as a hibernation site by Greater Horseshoe Bats (Rhinolophus ferrumequinum). A rare and endangered species, the greater horseshoe bat is protected under the Wildlife and Countryside Act 1981 and is listed in Annex II of the 1992 European Community Habitats Directive.

Along with Combe Down and Bathampton Down Mines this site forms a key part of the Bath and Bradford-on-Avon Bats candidate Special Area of Conservation (cSAC).

See also 
 Caves of the Mendip Hills

References

External links 
Compton Martin Ochre Mine (Mineralogy of the Mendips) GCR database
Compton Martin Ochre Mine
Compton Martin Village website
English Nature (SSSI information)

Bath and North East Somerset
Environment of Somerset
Caves of the Mendip Hills
Sites of Special Scientific Interest in Avon
Sites of Special Scientific Interest notified in 1988
Limestone caves
Mines in Somerset